Nur Mohammad Bazar (also Romanized as Nūr Moḩammad Bāzār) is a village in Pir Sohrab Rural District, in the Central District of Chabahar County, Sistan and Baluchestan Province, Iran.

Population
At the 2006 census, its population was 135, in 26 families.

References 

Populated places in Chabahar County